Pierre-Hugues Herbert and Maxime Teixeira were the defending champions but decided not to participate.
Johan Brunström and Raven Klaasen won the final 3–6, 6–2, [10–3] against Jamie Delgado and Ken Skupski.

Seeds

Draw

Draw

References
 Main Draw

Open BNP Paribas Banque de Bretagne - Doubles
2013 Doubles